Naranbhai may refer to

Naranbhai Kachhadia, Indian Politician 
Naranbhai Keshavlal Parikh, Indian Politician
Naranbhai Rathwa, Indian Politician

Indian masculine given names